Surfing Goat Dairy is a dairy farm in Kula, Hawaii on the island of Maui. It produces more than two dozen goat cheeses. Many of the cheeses have won national awards. Tours are offered. Surfing Goat was established in 1998 and is owned by Germans Thomas and Eva Kafsack. It is located on 42 acres and is one of only two goat dairies in Hawaii as of 2014.  It is located on the slopes of the Haleakalā crater. The dairy's motto is: Da' Feta Mo' Betta.

See also
Omaopio
 List of dairy product companies in the United States

References

External links

Dairy products companies of the United States
Farms in Hawaii
Buildings and structures in Maui County, Hawaii
Companies based in Hawaii
Food and drink companies established in 1998
1998 establishments in Hawaii